Wuttichai Masuk (born 16 March 1990 at Buriram Province), is a Thai boxer who competes in the light welterweight division. He won the gold medal at the 2009 Asian Amateur Boxing Championships after defeating Hurshid Tojibaev of Uzbekistan. He also won gold medal of the Boxing at the 2014 Asian Games.

Masuk is also one of the most successful boxers in the Southeast Asian Games with four gold medals. He ruled the light welterweight division in the biennial multi-sport meet in 2013, 2015 and 2017 and added a fourth gold medal as a welterweight in 2019.

His brother Suthin is also an international boxer.

References

External links 

 
 
 
 

1990 births
Living people
Wuttichai Masuk
Wuttichai Masuk
Light-welterweight boxers
Boxers at the 2016 Summer Olympics
Wuttichai Masuk
AIBA World Boxing Championships medalists
Boxers at the 2010 Asian Games
Boxers at the 2014 Asian Games
Boxers at the 2018 Asian Games
Wuttichai Masuk
Wuttichai Masuk
Asian Games medalists in boxing
Medalists at the 2010 Asian Games
Medalists at the 2014 Asian Games
Medalists at the 2018 Asian Games
Wuttichai Masuk
Wuttichai Masuk
Southeast Asian Games medalists in boxing
Competitors at the 2009 Southeast Asian Games
Competitors at the 2013 Southeast Asian Games
Competitors at the 2015 Southeast Asian Games
Competitors at the 2017 Southeast Asian Games
Competitors at the 2019 Southeast Asian Games
Wuttichai Masuk
Wuttichai Masuk